Koulsy Lamko (born 1959) is a Chadian-born playwright, poet, novelist and university lecturer.  Born in Dadouar, Lamko left his country for Burkina Faso in 1979 due to the beginning of the civil war.  There, he became acquainted with Thomas Sankara and involved with the Institute of Black Peoples in Ouagadougou.  Lamko spent ten years promoting community theater in Burkina Faso through the Theater of the Community and helped found the International Festival of Theatre for Development.  Some of his poetry was published in Revue Noire in 1994.  In 1997 he co-released the album Bir Ki Mbo of mixed poetry and music in tribute to Sankara in collaboration with Stéphane Scott and Rémi Stengel.  A regular attendant at the Limousin Festival International des Francophonies, he briefly lived in Limoges, France.  He then moved to Rwanda, where he read for his doctorate at the National University in Butare while founding the university's Center for the Arts and the Theater and teaching theater and creative writing.  His doctoral thesis was on emerging theatrical aesthetics in Africa.  His experience in Rwanda led him to write his novel, La phalène des collines ("The butterfly of the hills"), about the 1994 genocide.

In 2009 he stayed, as a guest of Amsterdam Vluchtstad, in the former apartment of Anne Frank and her family at the Amsterdam Merwedeplein.

He currently lives in Mexico City.

Publications 
Plays
 Le camp tend la sébile, 1988, Editions Presses Universitaires de Limoges
 Ndo kela ou l'initiation avortée, 1993, Editions Lansman
 Tout bas … si bas, 1995, Editions Lansman
 Comme des flèches, 1996, Editions Lansman
 Le mot dans la rosée, 1997, Editions Actes Sud Papiers
 La tête sous l'aisselle, 1997, Editions Ligue de l'Enseignement and DGER

Short stories and tales
 Regards dans une larme, 1990, Editions Mondia-Canada
 Les repos des masques, 1995, Editions Marval
 Sou, sou, sou, gré, gré, gré, 1995, Editions FOL Haute Vienne
 Aurore, 1997, Editions Le bruit des autres

Novels
 La phalène des collines, 2000, Centre Universitaire des Arts
 Les racines du yucca, 2011, Philippe Rey

Poetry
 Exils, Solignac 1993, Le bruit des Autres

Essays
 Koulsy Lamko on exotic man, 2009, The Power of Culture

Notes and references 

Chadian dramatists and playwrights
Chadian academics
1959 births
Living people
Chadian novelists
Chadian poets
Chadian short story writers
People from Guéra Region
20th-century dramatists and playwrights
20th-century novelists
20th-century poets
20th-century short story writers